Amaya Drive station is a San Diego Trolley station served by the Orange and Green Lines in the San Diego suburb of La Mesa, California. It serves mainly as a park and ride stop for the surrounding community.

History
Green Line service began in July 1995, when the segment connecting  to  first opened.

Station layout
There are two tracks, each served by a side platform.

See also
 List of San Diego Trolley stations

References

Green Line (San Diego Trolley)
Orange Line (San Diego Trolley)
San Diego Trolley stations
Railway stations in the United States opened in 1989
1989 establishments in California